Georgios Karaisaridis (born 2 April 1971) is a retired Greek football defender.

References

1971 births
Living people
Greek footballers
Edessaikos F.C. players
Kalamata F.C. players
Kavala F.C. players
Panionios F.C. players
Athinaikos F.C. players
A.O. Kerkyra players
Association football defenders
Super League Greece players
Footballers from Brussels